Toolburra is a rural locality in the Southern Downs Region, Queensland, Australia. In the  Toolburra had a population of 42 people.

Geography
Toolburra is an agricultural locality with little urban development. The Condamine River passes through the district and forms part of its boundaries on the north-west and south-east. The river's confluence with tributary Splityard Creek occurs in the centre of the district. The Warwick-Allora Road passes through the locality from the south-east to the north-west forming part of the south-east and north-west boundaries of the locality. The Southern railway line runs parallel and slightly to the north of the Warwick-Allora Road. Toolburra railway station is on this line; however there are currently no passenger services operating on this line.

History
The locality name Toolburra is taken from an 1840 pastoral run, and is believed to be a word from the Gidabal language, which means either tree people, territory marked by a clump of trees or spears being thrown.

Toolburra South State School opened on 2 June 1879. In 1924 it was renamed Greymare State School. It closed on 1966.

In the  Toolburra had a population of 42 people.

Heritage listings
Heritage-listed sites in Toolburra include:
 Serisier Road: Assmanshausen Winery

References

Southern Downs Region
Darling Downs
Localities in Queensland